The Anglican Diocese of Ikara is one of eleven within the Anglican Province of Kaduna, itself one of 14 provinces within the Church of Nigeria. The current bishop is Yusuf Janfalan

Notes

Church of Nigeria dioceses
Dioceses of the Province of Kaduna